Transient erythroporphyria of infancy is a cutaneous condition reported in infants exposed to blue lights for the treatment of indirect hyperbilirubinemia characterized by marked purpura in skin exposed to the UV light.

See also 
 Porphyria
 Skin lesion

References 

Skin conditions resulting from errors in metabolism